In the Book of Mormon, Joseph is a priest, and a youngest brother of the prophets Nephi and Jacob.

The chapter  deals with Lehi blessing Joseph specifically:

1 And now I speak unto you, Joseph, my last-born. Thou wast born in the wilderness of mine afflictions; yea, in the days of my greatest sorrow did thy mother bear thee. (2 Nephi 3:1)

It appears that Joseph married and had children, and the Encyclopedia of Mormonism states that "the Josephites are implied to have been descendants of Joseph, Nephi's youngest brother. The text is silent on any distinctive characteristics."

Etymology
The name Joseph is to be found in both the Old and New Testaments, and indeed the Book of Mormon remarks that he shares his name with Joseph son of Jacob and Rachel, as well as discussion of what appears to be a reference to Joseph Smith himself. Joseph, the adoptive father of Jesus is not mentioned.

The name can be translated from Hebrew  yosef YHWH as signifying "Yahweh/Jehovah shall increase/add".

Family

See also
 Joseph (disambiguation)

References

Book of Mormon people